Suluca can refer to:

 Suluca, Keşan
 Suluca, Lapseki
 Suluca, Muş
 Suluca, Sarıçam